Régis Augusto Salmazzo (born 30 November 1992), simply known as Régis, is a Brazilian professional footballer who plays as an attacking midfielder for Coritiba.

Club career

São Paulo and loans
Born in Jales, São Paulo, Régis was a São Paulo youth graduate. He was loaned to Paulista ahead of the 2013 season, and made his senior debut on 20 January of that year by coming on as a substitute in a 1–1 Campeonato Paulista home draw against Corinthians.

On 27 September 2013 Régis was loaned to América-RN, in the Série B. He scored his first professional goal on 12 November, netting the first in a 2–2 home draw against América Mineiro, and contributed with five goals in ten appearances before returning to Tricolor.

Chapecoense / Sport Recife
On 23 January 2014, Régis was sold to an investment fund, being assigned to Chapecoense for six months. On 2 July, however, after being the top goalscorer of the year's Campeonato Catarinense, he signed a four-year deal with Sport.

Régis scored his first Série A goal on 17 August 2014, netting the equalizer in a 1–1 home draw against Atlético Paranaense. He started to feature more regularly the following year, mainly as a substitute to Diego Souza and Marlone.

On 18 December 2015, Régis signed a one-year loan deal with Palmeiras, who overcame Santos for his signature.

Bahia
Régis was rarely used at Verdão, and moved to Bahia the following 24 May, on an 18-month loan deal. He signed a permanent contract with the club in 2018, and in March 2019, after a temporary deal at Al-Wehda, he joined Corinthians on loan until December.

Career statistics

Honours
Bahia
Copa do Nordeste: 2017
Campeonato Baiano: 2018

Corinthians
Campeonato Paulista: 2019

References

External links

1992 births
Living people
Footballers from São Paulo (state)
Brazilian footballers
Association football midfielders
Campeonato Brasileiro Série A players
Campeonato Brasileiro Série B players
São Paulo FC players
Paulista Futebol Clube players
América Futebol Clube (RN) players
Associação Chapecoense de Futebol players
Sport Club do Recife players
Sociedade Esportiva Palmeiras players
Esporte Clube Bahia players
Sport Club Corinthians Paulista players
Cruzeiro Esporte Clube players
Guarani FC players
Coritiba Foot Ball Club players
Al-Wehda Club (Mecca) players
Brazilian expatriate footballers
Brazilian expatriate sportspeople in Saudi Arabia
Expatriate footballers in Saudi Arabia
People from Jales